Kate Bishop may refer to:
 Hawkeye (Kate Bishop), a Marvel Comics character
 Kate Bishop (Marvel Cinematic Universe), the screen adaptation of the character
 Kate Bishop (actress) (1848–1923), an English actress